A cheeseburger is a hamburger topped with cheese. Traditionally, the slice of cheese is placed on top of the meat patty. The cheese is usually added to the cooking hamburger patty shortly before serving, which allows the cheese to melt. Cheeseburgers can include variations in structure, ingredients and composition. As with other hamburgers, a cheeseburger may include toppings such as lettuce, tomato, onion, pickles, bacon, mayonnaise, ketchup, and mustard.

In fast food restaurants, the cheese used in cheeseburgers is usually processed cheese. Other meltable cheeses may be used as alternatives. Common examples include cheddar, Swiss, mozzarella, blue cheese, and pepper jack. Popular restaurants that sell cheeseburgers include McDonald's, Burger King, Wendy's, and many more.

Origins
By the late 19th century, the vast grasslands of the Great Plains had been opened up for cattle ranching. This made it possible for many Americans to consume beef almost daily. The hamburger remains as one of the cheapest sources of beef in America.

Adding cheese to hamburgers became popular in 1920. There are several competing claims as to who created the first cheeseburger. Lionel Sternberger is reputed to have introduced the cheeseburger in 1924 at the age of 16. He was working as a fry cook at his father's Pasadena, California sandwich shop, "The Rite Spot", and "experimentally dropped a slab of American cheese on a sizzling hamburger."
An early example of the cheeseburger appearing on a menu is a 1928 menu for the Los Angeles restaurant O'Dell's which listed a cheeseburger smothered with chili for 25 cents.

Other restaurants also claim to have invented the cheeseburger. For example,  Kaelin's Restaurant in Louisville, Kentucky, said it invented the cheeseburger in 1934. One year later, a trademark for the name "cheeseburger" was awarded to Louis Ballast of the Humpty Dumpty Drive-In in Denver, Colorado. According to Steak 'n Shake archives, the restaurant's founder, Gus Belt, applied for a trademark on the word in the 1930s.

An A&W Restaurants franchise in Lansing, Michigan is credited with inventing the bacon cheeseburger in 1963, putting it on the menu after repeated requests from the same customer.

The steamed cheeseburger, a variation almost exclusively served in central Connecticut, is believed to have been invented at a restaurant called Jack's Lunch in Middletown, Connecticut, in the 1930s.

In the United States, National Cheeseburger Day is celebrated annually on September 18.

Ingredients

The ingredients used to create cheeseburgers follow similar patterns found in the regional variations of hamburgers, although most start with ground beef.  Common cheeses used for topping are American, Swiss, Cheddar and other meltable cheeses. Popular toppings include lettuce, tomato, onion, pickles, bacon, avocado or guacamole, sliced sautéed mushrooms, cheese sauce or chili, but the variety of possible toppings is broad.

A cheeseburger may have more than one patty or more than one slice of cheese—it is reasonably common, but by no means automatic, for the number to increase at the same rate with cheese and meat interleaved. A stack of two or more patties follows the same basic pattern as hamburgers: with two patties will be called a double cheeseburger; a triple cheeseburger has three, and while much less common, a quadruple has four.  

Sometimes cheeseburgers are prepared with the cheese enclosed within the ground beef, rather than on top. This is sometimes known as a Jucy Lucy.

Religious
Traditionally, this dish breaches the kosher laws (kashrut) observed by Judaism as it combines ground beef and cheese. Mixtures of milk and meat (basar bechalav, literally "meat in milk") are prohibited according to Jewish religious law (halakha), following a verse in the Book of Exodus in which Jews are forbidden from "boiling a (kid) goat in its mother's milk" (Exod. 34:26). This prohibition appears again in Deuteronomy.  This dietary law sparked controversy in Jerusalem when McDonald's began opening franchises there that sold cheeseburgers. Since that time, McDonald's has opened both kosher and non-kosher restaurants in Israel.

In an attempt to provide a "kosher cheeseburger", a kosher restaurant in New York City created a controversial cheeseburger variation which replaces cheese with soy cheese.

Gallery

See also

 Cheeseburger bill
 "Cheeseburger in Paradise"
 I Can Has Cheezburger?
 List of hamburgers
 List of hamburger restaurants
 List of sandwiches
 Patty melt
 Slider
 Steamed cheeseburger

References

Further reading

American sandwiches
Hamburgers (food)
Cheese sandwiches
Culture of Pasadena, California
Culture of Denver
Fast food
Cheese dishes
Independence Day (United States) foods